The Schumacher Menace GTR is a radio-controlled car made by Schumacher Racing Products, powered by a nitro fuel engine. It is essentially a Schumacher Menace made into an on-road car. This is accomplished using lower shock towers, shorter dampers, different tires, wheels and other small adjustments. The result is an on-road car that is just as fast as the Schumacher Fusion in a straight line speed but that can corner a lot faster due to its wider chassis and more stable nature.

Schumacher also produce an electric powered version, the Schumacher GTRe, which is similar in design but with a 540-size electric motor. The GTRe also includes the three-speed gearbox and disc brake system, something which is highly unusual for an electric RC-car of this type—electric on-road cars usually use motor braking and no gearbox.

Specifications 
 Type: 1:8, 4WD, on-road.
 Engine: .21 (3.5cc) ABC Pro Engine, Thunder Tiger.
 Maximum power: 2.1 HP at 38,000 RPM.
 Maximum engine RPM: 40,000 RPM.
 Gearbox: Three gears (fixed).
 Brakes: Crossdrilled carbon fiber single disk/stainless steel calipers.
 Weight: 2.4 kg (dry).
 Fuel tank: 125cc.
 Chassis: 3.0 mm aluminium (anodized).
 Body: Lexan (McLaren F1 GTR).
 Length: 500 mm.
 Suspension: Independent C-hubs, adjustable camber and toe.
 Dampers: Oil-filled dampers with springs, aluminium (anodized).
 Drivetrain: 4WD by extra wide belt.
 Front Wheels: Chrome Plastic Spoke-Style 27x55mm.
 Rear Wheels: Chrome Plastic Spoke-Style 37x55mm.
 Front Tires: Treaded Rubber 33x77mm.
 Rear Tires: Treaded Rubber 43x77mm.

Performance 
 0-60 MPH: Estimated under 2 seconds with ideal configuration and conditions.
 Top speed: Estimated 70 MPH with high speed gearing.

Criticism 
 Gearbox is not natively adjustable.
 Castor not adjustable.
 Toe not adjustable on the rear wheels.
 Open differential (i.e. not adjustable).
 The gearbox is open and debris from the road can easily enter and thus break one or several gears.
 To access the gearbox when making modifications or repairs, major parts of the car has to be disassembled, e.g. the engine has to be removed.

External links
 Schumacher - official site
 RC Universe - RC Universe review

Schumacher Racing Products